Leon Theo Williams (December 2, 1905 – November 20, 1984),nicknamed "Lefty", was a Major League Baseball player who played pitcher in . He played for the Brooklyn Robins.

External links

1905 births
1984 deaths
Major League Baseball infielders
Brooklyn Robins players
Jersey City Skeeters players
Buffalo Bisons (minor league) players